Harun Doğan (1 January 1976 in Kahramanmaraş, Turkey) is a Turkish retired World and European champion sports wrestler competing in the -58 kg division of men's freestyle wrestling. He was coached by Avni Tarhan. In 2005 he was banned from sport for life after his second doping violation.

Scandal
At the 2000 Summer Olympics, he caused scandals. In his second match in the elimination round, he did not wear the official Turkish wrestling singlet with the national star and crescent insignia but his own singlet despite warnings of the team leader. At his third match, he deliberately did not show, and lost the match against Russian Murad Ramazanov by forfeit. For his unsportsmanlike behaviour, Harun Doğan was punished later by the Turkish Federation, and was not taken into the team participating at the 4th World University Wrestling Championships held 2000 in Tokyo, Japan.

Doping cases
Harun Doğan was involved in a doping case at the 2002 World Wrestling Championships held in Tehran, Iran. He tested positive for the banned substance efedrin, and was suspended from wrestling for two years.

At the 2005 Turkish National Championship Doğan tested positive for the anabolic steroid metenolone, and was subsequently banned from sport for life.

Achievements
 1990 World Youth Championship, Hungary -  43 kg
 1991 World Youth Championship, Canada -  47 kg
 1992 World Youth Championship, Colombia -  50 kg
 1994 European Junior Championship, Finland -  57 kg
 1995 World Wrestling Championships, USA -   57 kg
 1995 European Wrestling Championships, Switzerland -  5th 57 kg
 1996 European Wrestling Championships, Hungary -  57 kg
 1996 Summer Olympics, USA - 4th 57 kg
 1997 Mediterranean Games, Italy -  58 kg
 1998 European Wrestling Championships, Slovakia - 8th 58 kg
 1998 World Wrestling Championships, Iran -   58 kg
 1999 European Wrestling Championships, Russia -  58 kg
 1999 World Wrestling Championships, Turkey -   58 kg
 2000 Summer Olympics, Australia - 15th 58 kg
 2004 Summer Olympics, USA - 20th 55 kg

References

External links 
 

1976 births
Sportspeople from Kahramanmaraş
Olympic wrestlers of Turkey
Wrestlers at the 1996 Summer Olympics
Wrestlers at the 2000 Summer Olympics
Turkish male sport wrestlers
Wrestlers at the 2004 Summer Olympics
Doping cases in wrestling
Turkish sportspeople in doping cases
Living people
World Wrestling Championships medalists
Mediterranean Games gold medalists for Turkey
Competitors at the 1997 Mediterranean Games
Mediterranean Games medalists in wrestling
European Wrestling Championships medalists
20th-century Turkish people
21st-century Turkish people
World Wrestling Champions